Bacterioplanoides pacificum is a Gram-negative, strictly aerobic and motile bacterium from the genus of Bacterioplanoides with a single polar flagellum which has been isolated from the South Pacific Gyre.

References

External links
Type strain of Bacterioplanoides pacificum at BacDive -  the Bacterial Diversity Metadatabase

Oceanospirillales
Bacteria described in 2016